ClinicoEconomics and Outcomes Research  is a peer-reviewed healthcare journal focusing on covering the economic impact of health policy and health systems organization. The journal was established in 2009 and is published by Dove Medical Press.

External links 
 

English-language journals
Open access journals
Dove Medical Press academic journals
Healthcare journals
Publications established in 2009